Eupithecia owenata is a moth in the family Geometridae first described by James Halliday McDunnough in 1944. It is found in the southern-western United States, including New Mexico, Arizona and California.

The wingspan is about 23 mm. Adults have been recorded on wing from June to August.

References

Moths described in 1944
owenata
Moths of North America